Maleyevo is a rural locality (a village) in Ivanovskoye Rural Settlement, Vashkinsky District, Vologda Oblast, Russia. The population was 88 as of 2002.

Geography 
The distance to Lipin Bor is 56 km, to Ivanovskaya is 1 km. Ivanovskaya is the nearest rural locality.

References 

Rural localities in Vashkinsky District